Bhitargaon is a town, near city of Kanpur in Kanpur district, Uttar Pradesh, India, known for its ancient Hindu temple, the largest Indian brick temple to survive from the time of the Gupta Empire.  Despite being heavily restored, a number of original features remain. It is dated to the late 5th century.

Bhitargaon Temple

The Bhitargaon Temple is a terraced brick building fronted with a terracotta panel. Built in the 5th century during the Gupta period, it is the oldest remaining brick/terracotta Hindu shrine with a roof and a high shikhara, though its upper chamber did sustain some damage in the 18th century.

The temple is built on a square plan with double-recessed corners and faces east. There is a tall pyramidal spire over the garbhagriha. The walls are decorated with terracotta panels depicting Shiva and Vishnu etc. When Alexander Cunningham first visited the site, the remains of the porch and of the ardhamandapa were still visible, which later collapsed.

Description of the architecture and layout of Bhitargaon temple 
The construction material is bricks and terracotta. The brick size is 18" x 9'' x 3" and the other salient features are following:
The size of platform on which the temple is built is 36 feet x 47 feet.
The sanctum is 15 feet x 15 feet internally.
The sanctum is double story.
The wall thickness is 8 feet.
The total height from ground to top is 68.25 feet.
There is no window.
The terracotta sculpture depicts both secular and religious theme such as deities like Ganesha and Durga Mahisasurmardini. Myths and stories representing abduction of Sita and the penance of Nara-Narayana.
Shikara is a stepped pyramid and got damaged by thunder in 1894.
The first story of sanctum felled in 1850.

Behta Bujurg temple
There is another ancient temple in Behta Bujurg (or Behata Bujurg) village which is only 4.3 km far from Bhitargaon, also protected by the Archaeological Survey of India. The temple is dedicated to Lord Jagannath, and has a highly unusual curving shape, with buddhist stupa(Mound) like resemblance. However a close look reveals nagara style curvilinear shape. There are significant detached ancient sculptures: Lord Jagannath idol, a Surya (sun deity) sculpture and a Lord Vishnu sculpture carved on a large block of stone depicting lord vishnu resting on seshnaga.  The temple is known locally as the "Rain Temple" as the ceiling is said to drip water several days before the rain arrive, which is of great interest to local farmers.

Other historic brick temples
 Po Nagar and Po Klong Garai
 Mahabodhi Temple
 :id:Candi Bima Dieng Candi Bima
 Sambor Prei Kuk
 Sirpur, Mahasamund Laksman temple
 Rajgir Maniyar Math, Vaibhar giri temples
 Bishnupur, Bankura
  Kherahat temple
  Kalar, brick temple

Gallery

See also
 Gupta art
 Hindu temple architecture (Historical Chronology) 
 Teli Ka Mandir, Gwalior

References

External links
 Bhitargaon
 Heritage and Tourism, Kanpur City Development Plan
 Brick temples 

Neighbourhoods in Kanpur
5th-century Hindu temples
Cities and towns in Kanpur Nagar district
Hindu temples in Uttar Pradesh
Gupta art